Nîmes railway station  is a railway station in Nîmes, Gard département, France. It is located at 1 Boulevard Sergent Triaire, 30000 Nîmes.

History 

The station was used by more than 4 million travelers in 2016.

Train services
The following services currently call at the station:

High-speed services (TGV) Paris–Valence–Nîmes–Montpellier (- Béziers)
High-speed services (TGV) Paris–Lyon–Nîmes–Montpellier–Narbonne–Perpignan
High-speed services (TGV) Paris–Valence–Nîmes–Montpellier–Perpignan–Barcelona
High-speed services (TGV) Lyon–Nîmes–Montpellier–Perpignan–Barcelona
High-speed services (AVE) Marseille–Nîmes–Montpellier–Perpignan–Barcelona–Madrid
High-speed services (TGV) Brussels–Lille–Paris-CDG Airport–Lyon–Nîmes–Montpellier–Perpignan
High-speed services (TGV) Lyon–Nîmes–Montpellier–Toulouse
Intercity services (Intercités) Bordeaux–Toulouse–Montpellier–Marseille
Regional services (TER Occitanie) Narbonne–Béziers–Montpellier–Nîmes–Avignon
Regional services (TER Occitanie) Cerbère–Perpignan–Narbonne–Montpellier–Nîmes–Avignon
Regional services (TER Occitanie) Narbonne–Montpellier–Nîmes–Arles–Marseille
Local services (TER Occitanie) Nîmes–Vauvert–Le Grau-du-Roi
Local services (TER Occitanie) Clermont-Ferrand–Brioude–Génolhac–Alès–Nîmes

References

External links
 

Railway stations in France opened in 1845
Railway Station
Railway stations in Gard